Waikari River may refer to:

 Waikari River (Canterbury)
 Waikari River (Hawke's Bay)

See also
Waikare River (disambiguation)